Reversal of Fortune is a 1990 American drama film adapted from the 1985 book Reversal of Fortune: Inside the von Bülow Case, written by law professor Alan Dershowitz. It recounts the true story of the unexplained coma of socialite Sunny von Bülow, the subsequent attempted murder trial, and the eventual acquittal of her husband, Claus von Bülow, who had Dershowitz as his defense attorney. The film was directed by Barbet Schroeder and stars Jeremy Irons as Claus, Glenn Close as Sunny, and Ron Silver as Dershowitz. Screenwriter Nick Kazan originally envisioned Austrian actor Klaus Maria Brandauer in the role of Claus von Bülow, but was thrilled with Irons' performance. Irons earned the 1990 Academy Award for Best Actor for his performance in the film.

Plot
The story is narrated by Sunny von Bülow, who is in a coma after falling into diabetic shock after a Christmas party. Her husband, the dissolute European aristocrat Claus von Bülow, is charged with attempting to murder the hypoglycemic Sunny by giving her an overdose of insulin. Claus's strained relationship with his wife and his cold and haughty personal demeanor led most people to conclude that he is guilty. In need of an innovative defense, Claus turns to law professor Alan Dershowitz. Dershowitz is initially convinced of Claus's guilt, but takes the case because von Bülow agrees to fund Dershowitz's defense of two poor black boys accused of capital murder. Employing his law students as workers, Dershowitz proceeds to defend Claus, wrestling with his client's unnerving personal style and questions of von Bülow's guilt or innocence.

Cast 

Glenn Close as Sunny von Bülow
Jeremy Irons as Claus von Bülow
Ron Silver as Alan Dershowitz
Uta Hagen as Maria
Annabella Sciorra as Sarah
Fisher Stevens as David Marriott
Jack Gilpin as Peter MacIntosh
Christine Baranski as Andrea Reynolds
Stephen Mailer as Elon Dershowitz
Felicity Huffman as Minnie
Johann Carlo as Nancy
Keith Reddin as Dobbs
Mitchell Whitfield as Curly
Tom Wright as Jack
Michael Lord as Ed
Lisa Gay Hamilton as Mary
Julie Hagerty as Alexandra Isles
Bill Camp as Bill
Mano Singh as Raj

Production
The film was shot in numerous estates in Rhode Island and New Jersey, and the Knole house in Old Westbury, New York. At least one courtroom scene was shot at the Appellate Division, Second Judicial Department in Brooklyn, New York.

Reception 
The film received mostly positive reviews and holds a 92% approval rating at Rotten Tomatoes, with an average score of 7.9/10 from 51 reviews. The site's consensus states: "Featuring exceptional performances and a cunning script, Reversal of Fortune doubles as a tantalizing mystery and ruthless satire of the rich."

Accolades 

In 2015, the 25th anniversary of Entertainment Weekly named Reversal of Fortune on its list of the 25 best films of the past 25 years.

The film is recognized by American Film Institute in these lists:
 2003: AFI's 100 Years...100 Heroes and Villains:
 Claus von Bulow – Nominated Villain
 2008: AFI's 10 Top 10:
 Nominated Courtroom Drama Film

See also
List of films featuring diabetes

References

External links

 
 
 
 
 

1990 films
1990s biographical drama films
American biographical drama films
American courtroom films
Films about lawyers
American films based on actual events
Films based on non-fiction books
Films directed by Barbet Schroeder
Films featuring a Best Actor Academy Award-winning performance
Films featuring a Best Drama Actor Golden Globe winning performance
Films set in Rhode Island
Films set in the 1980s
Warner Bros. films
Films scored by Mark Isham
1990 drama films
Alan Dershowitz
1990s English-language films
1990s American films